Kathleen A. FitzGibbon is an American diplomat who is the nominee to serve as the next US Ambassador to Niger.

Early life and education
FitzGibbon earned her Bachelor’s degree from Hartwick College and a Master’s degree from the University of California, Davis.

Career
FitzGibbon is a career member of the Senior Foreign Service, with the rank of Minister-Counselor. Currently, she serves as the Deputy Chief of Mission of the U.S. Embassy in Abuja, Nigeria. Before that, FitzGibbon served as the first Division Chief, West and Southern Africa, and then the Director of the Office of Africa Analysis in the Bureau of Intelligence and Research within the U.S. Department of State. Other assignments in Africa include service as the Deputy Chief of Mission of the U.S. Embassies in Sierra Leone and Gabon, as well as the chief of the Political and Economic section of the U.S. Embassy in Uganda. FitzGibbon also served at the U.S. Embassy in Chad and had an earlier posting in Nigeria. FitzGibbon also worked in the Office to Combat and Monitor Trafficking in Persons in the State Department. Before joining the State Department, she was a lecturer at Mary Washington College in Fredericksburg, Virginia.

Nomination as ambassador to Niger
On July 29, 2022, President Joe Biden announced his intent to nominate FitzGibbon as the next ambassador to Niger. On August 3, 2022, her nomination was sent to the United States Senate. Her nomination was sent back to Biden on January 3, 2022 as no action was taken on it for the rest of the year.

President Biden renominated FitzGibbon the same day. Her nomination is pending before the Senate Foreign Relations Committee.

Personal life
FitzGibbon speaks French.

References

Living people
Hartwick College alumni
University of California, Davis alumni
United States Foreign Service personnel
American diplomats
Year of birth missing (living people)
American women diplomats